Humpback Mountain is a mountain in the North Carolina High Country and the Pisgah National Forest, located southwest of Linville Falls. The mountain is accessible along the Blue Ridge Parkway, which ride along its eastern slope. Two ridges, Mill Ridge and Dividing Ridge, form from the western side of the mountain.

Split by the Eastern Continental Divide, the mountain generates feeder streams to the North Fork Catawba River on its eastern slopes and to the North Toe River on its western slopes.

Land conservancy
On December 5, 2013, the Conservation Trust of North Carolina purchased  along the Blue Ridge Parkway for $2.5 million, most of which is on Humpback Mountain.  The property will eventually be transferred over to the North Carolina Wildlife Resources Commission to own and manage.

References

Mountains of North Carolina
Mountains of Avery County, North Carolina